"Silver Train" is a song by the English rock and roll band the Rolling Stones, from their 1973 album Goats Head Soup. The lyrics deal with the singer's relationship with a prostitute. Recording of the song had already begun in 1970 during sessions for Sticky Fingers. It also was the B-side of the single "Angie", which went to No. 1 in the US and top 5 in the UK.

Reception
Rolling Stone critic Bud Scoppa had this to say of the song:

Covers
After hearing a demo of the tune, Johnny Winter recorded a cover of it for his album Still Alive and Well in 1973, months ahead of the Stones' release of Goats Head Soup.

The Black Crowes covered the song live. A cover of "Silver Train" also appears on the Carla Olson-Mick Taylor album Too Hot For Snakes, which was released in 1991.

Live performances
The Rolling Stones played the song in concerts in 1973, but did not perform it again until 2014's 14 On Fire tour with Mick Taylor, who played on the original recording as a special guest.

References

The Rolling Stones songs
Songs written by Jagger–Richards
Song recordings produced by Jimmy Miller
Songs about trains
Music videos directed by Michael Lindsay-Hogg